Nicolaus Adam Radford known as Nic Radford (born November 5, 1977) is an American engineer, roboticist, inventor, and entrepreneur raising over $250mm in funding for his companies. He is the president and CEO of Nauticus Robotics, Inc. (NSADAQ:KITT) a robotics firm he founded. He also founded Jacobi Motors, his company spun out of HMI to commercialize his variable flux motor research from graduate school. He also started Rad Capital Ventures to invest in the trading of electricity. Prior to forming HMI, he spent 14 years at Lyndon B. Johnson Space Center's Dexterous Robotics Laboratory at NASA in Houston, Texas. Radford was the principal investigator tasked with leading the development of Valkyrie for participation in the 2013 DARPA Robotics Challenge (DRC) and NASA's future Mars robotics missions.

Preceding the DRC, he operated as deputy and chief engineer for Robonaut 2 (R2), a humanoid robot that was developed in partnership between NASA and General Motors. Additionally, during his tenure at NASA, he became a leader in wearable robotics and exoskeletons for spaceflight, rehabilitation, and abled body human performance augmentation. Radford is active in the areas of electric motor design towards robotics and electric cars, winning awards for his research in variable flux technology. Radford holds numerous patents, has authored several publications, and earned a BSEE and a MSEE both from Purdue University. In 2017, Radford was the recipient of the Houston Business Journal's Top 40 Under 40 Award.

Early life and education

Born in Champaign, Illinois, United States, Radford's family moved to Indiana when he was two months old, settling in Columbus when he was five. He attended Columbus North High School and excelled in track and field, namely high jump, where he set the indoor/outdoor record, and high hurdling, as well as varsity football. He was the 1996 recipient of the Dr. McKain Award for demonstrating "high character as a student and as a citizen in the community." He attended Purdue University and received his Bachelor of Science in Electrical and Computer Engineering in 2000. While at Purdue, Radford was a member of the Purdue Engineering Student Council and participated in Purdue Track and Field as a decathlete. A chronic ankle injury prevented him from pursuing track beyond his freshman year.

After starting his career at NASA-JSC, he attended graduate school remotely at Purdue University and received his Master of Science in Electrical and Computer Engineering in 2012. His research, sponsored by Dr. Gill Pratt of DARPA, was in a new class of electric motors and his thesis was entitled, "Analysis and Design of a Variable Flux Memory Motor for a Humanoid Robot Application." He was the recipient of the Grainger Foundation Outstanding Power and Energy Devices and Systems Award in April 2012, for his contribution to the field of Variable Flux Memory Motors. In 2010, he discussed how his time at Purdue prepared him for his future endeavors, "Purdue is a very hands-on, laboratory- and design-oriented university. This equipped me well for my work at NASA. You truly understand the value of Purdue once you get out and have a little perspective. It offers an education that goes beyond textbooks.

Career

Early career
After graduating from Purdue University with his BSEE, Radford moved to Houston, Texas initially for a position with United Space Alliance as a robotics flight controller in the payload deployment retrieval system (PDRS) console in NASA's Mission Control Center (MCC). During this time, Radford co-founded the Amateur Spaceflight Association, a group of engineers that worked in their free time to become the first amateur group to launch a rocket into space. He developed the rocket's avionics and ground control subsystems and was able to secure Rabbit Semiconductor financial support for development of the avionic subsystems. ASA had garnered so much attention that the Houston Chronicle covered the amateur space race competition between themselves and the Civilian Space eXploration Team (CXST), another amateur rocket group with the same aspiration.
He then was employed by Oceaneering Space Systems as an electrical engineer contractor to NASA, where he worked onsite at JSC and became involved with the Dexterous Robotics Laboratory. Additionally for five years, he volunteered as a mentor for high school teams competing in the FIRST Robotics Competition, working with Team 118 Robonauts.

NASA
In 2008, Radford became a civil servant at NASA as chief engineer and deputy project manager for Robonaut 2, under Direct Hire Authority (DHA). This allowed the Office of Personnel Management (OPM) to expedite staffing requests to fill "a critical hiring need." He led large multidisciplinary teams of engineering staff in project endeavors for developing Robonaut 2, X1 Exoskeleton, DARPA's Warrior Web, as well as leading R2's redesign and qualification efforts for the International Space Station, which flew to ISS aboard Space Shuttle Discovery's final flight STS-133. In 2011, Radford became the principal investigator for NASA in the DARPA Robotics Challenge (DRC). He led a team of 55 engineers and technicians through design, development and field testing NASA's first full humanoid robot, created to aid in disaster relief efforts. He used this opportunity to create a very controversial female robot, as a source of inspiration for girls with STEM related endeavors. His team based Valkyrie's form on "armor worn by women throughout history" as well as a "nod to the Valkyries of Norse mythology." Valkyrie's name was also a tribute to previous NASA developed prototypes, including the North American XB-70 Valkyrie bomber, as well as an earlier robot Team 118 Robonauts created for FIRST.

In Slates 2015 article "Bot Looks Like a Lady", Radford discussed how NASA "missed a big opportunity" to inspire a new generation of women and girls, in maintaining their official stance that Valkyrie is gender neutral. He referred to his then seven-year-old daughter as proof, "She absolutely was in love with this robot. It was a major source of inspiration for her. She talked about it all the time. She drew pictures of Valkyrie." IEEE Spectrum's video where Radford introduced Valkyrie as NASA's Superhero Robot acquired over 2 million views. Radford attempted to shed light on the controversy indicating that Valkyrie was designed to be of the female form from the beginning.

Houston Mechatronics, Inc

HMI was established in 2014 with other NASA partners. Radford drives the vision of HMI. "He is responsible for building and growing HMI as a subsea robotics and mechatronics company in both energy and military domains." Early in the company's life, in 2015, HMI teamed up with Andretti Technologies to develop a new electric motor for Season Two of Formula E Racing. Due to lack of funding from Andretti, the motor was never fully completed and only saw the initial phase of track testing. In 2016, Andretti announced a new direction for Season Three and each party dissolved their partnership. HMI has secured Series A Funding with Schlumberger Technology Investments and licenses Purdue technology "that could optimize electric motor and design better alternatives in automation in the energy sector." By March 2017, Radford had raised a total of $23M in venture capital funding for HMI by also securing Series B Funding.

Radford has given many interviews and several invited talks on the subject. In 2015, he appeared in the documentary 'Ancient Aliens 2015: Aliens and Robots.'

The company began working on an autonomous unmanned undersea vehicle (UUV), Aquanaut, capable of operating deeper than 3,000 m in December 2017.

Influences and inspiration
Radford's papers and works have been cited over 790 times. In August 2020, he was highlighted by Houston's InnovationMap as an innovator to watch. As one of 17 prominent roboticists to respond to IEEE Spectrum's May 23, 2016 article asking what Google should do with its Boston Dynamics robots, Radford stated, "Google is probably one of a handful of companies with the resources to actually solve the humanoid robot challenge. And it is a solvable problem; it just requires some significant investment and tenacity to leave them alone and let them work. But unfortunately, for better or worse, the problems that are making money robotics today and tomorrow on the surface are far less sexy."

Radford's biggest inspiration is the challenge. According to his interview in IEEE Spectrum's article "Houston Mechatronics Raises $20M to Bring NASA Expertise to Transforming Robot Submersibles," Radford states, "Personally, I’ve found the transition to be invigorating. Starting a company is quite different than working for a government robotics research lab, but probably the biggest difference is the risk posture: startups are all about huge risks for huge returns. There is something so palatable about taking on the entrenched establishment in an industry, calling them out and saying, "I know you’ve been here for a while, but I think you’re doing it all wrong." There's a reason NASA didn't start SpaceX; oftentimes established organizations don't know of any other way to do what they do, and that's what's so thrilling about starting a new company— taking the risks."

References

External links
Houston Mechatronics, Inc

1977 births
Living people
People from Champaign, Illinois
Purdue University College of Engineering alumni
NASA people
Engineers from Illinois
American roboticists
American chief technology officers
21st-century American inventors
American technology chief executives
American company founders